Kevin Jamaal Koger (born December 12, 1989) is an American football coach and former college tight end who is currently the tight ends coach for the Los Angeles Chargers of the National Football League (NFL). He was a 2011 All-Big Ten honorable mention.  In 2012, Koger began working as a coach in Saline, Michigan. Just before signing day in February 2015, Koger joined Butch Jones’s staff at the University of Tennessee as a graduate assistant.

High school career
Koger played high school football at Whitmer High School in Toledo. He holds the school record with 1,190 career receiving yards on 75 receptions.  He finished his career with 16 offensive touchdowns. He recorded 151 tackles, 28 tackles for loss, 16 sacks, two forced fumbles, three fumble recoveries, two interceptions, and one interception return for a touchdown during his career. In his senior year, Koger made 31 receptions for 361 yards, scored five touchdowns, and contributed 48 tackles and seven sacks.

Honors and rankings
PrepStar Magazine All-American.
Four-star prospect, the nation's fourth-best tight end and the No. 10 player in the state of Ohio according to Rivals.com.
Four-star prospect and the sixth-best tight end nationally according to Scout.com.
Rated No. 5 on the Detroit Free Press Best of the Midwest rankings.
107th-best defensive end nationally by ESPN.com.
Gained All-Ohio first team accolades at defensive end as a senior.
Earned all-city honors as a tight end and defensive end as a junior.

College career

Koger accepted a scholarship to play at the University of Michigan, where he enrolled in the division of kinesiology.  He caught his first pass on September 27, 2008 against Wisconsin, which went for 26 yards and a touchdown. He took over starting tight end job in fifth week of the season against Illinois.

As a junior in 2010, Koger was watchlisted on the John Mackey Award list for tight ends.

As a senior in 2011, Koger caught 21 passes for 235 yards and four touchdowns. He had his best game of the year against Ohio State, totaling four catches for 40 yards and a touchdown. Following the 2011 Big Ten Conference football season, he earned All-Big Ten Conference honorable mention recognition.

On March 22, Koger endured a torn achilles tendon while doing plyometrics. He had surgery on March 27. The injury requires a five- to eight-month rehabilitation period. Koger went undrafted in the April 2012 NFL Draft.

Coaching career
Koger coached at Saline High School in Saline, Michigan, before joining the University of Michigan staff as a graduate assistant. In early February 2015, Koger was brought on at the University of Tennessee to serve as a graduate assistant on Butch Jones's staff. On February 15, 2019, Koger was hired as an offensive quality control coach for the Green Bay Packers.
On February 11, 2021, Koger was hired as the tight ends coach of the Los Angeles Chargers.

Notes

External links
Official bio at Michigan
Scout.com profile
Rivals profile
Koger at NCAA.org
Koger at ESPN

1989 births
Living people
African-American coaches of American football
African-American players of American football
American football tight ends
Eastern Kentucky Colonels football coaches
Green Bay Packers coaches
High school football coaches in Michigan
Los Angeles Chargers coaches
Michigan Wolverines football coaches
Michigan Wolverines football players
Players of American football from Ohio
Sportspeople from Toledo, Ohio
Tennessee Volunteers football coaches
21st-century African-American sportspeople
20th-century African-American people